Alameda Community Learning Center (ACLC), formerly known as Arthur Andersen Community Learning Center, is a 6th-12th grade public charter school located in Alameda, California, United States. It currently shares a campus with Nea Community Learning Center, operating under the same charter.

Mission statement 
The Alameda Community Learning Center an educational model that empowers all youth to take ownership of their educational experience, to celebrate their diverse community, and to actively participate as members in a democratic society.

History 
The Alameda Community Learning Center was created as a school in which the Graduate Profile of the Alameda Unified School District could live and breathe. The Graduate Profile is a document that was created at a visioning conference held by the AUSD in partnership with Arthur Andersen in 1992. Andersen funded the start-up costs for the school. After its first five years, the school became a charter school.

Leadership and Self-Governing

Judicial Committee 
The JC system, also known as the judicial committee, is made up of a group of elected learners and overseeing facilitator. JC enforces the rules of the school by hearing cases submitted by learners and facilitators and deciding on appropriate consequences to specific actions. The findings of the JC are binding on all parties involved and may result in further action, including suspension or expulsion, if necessary. The Judicial Committee (JC) is composed of five clerks elected by the learners and one facilitator selected by their peers. The JC meets five times each week to consider issues related to infringement of rules codified in the Law Book developed by CCC.

Leadership 
Leadership is one of the courses offered at ACLC. Leadership is similar to a student council, and conducts its business using Robert's Rules of Order. The group meets three times a week and works closely with a facilitator to deliberate, vote on, and implement proposals submitted by the community. Its responsibilities include codifying and enforcing rules, coordinating activities and field trips, and coordinating and facilitating the annual ACLC Constitutional Convention.

Courses 
ACLC has a set of graduation requirements designed to meet University of California requirements.

Electives include creative writing, computer science, Spanish, and digital arts, music, and filmmaking courses.

School Culture 
As of 2021, ACLC learners produce a weekly news program called CCC News. It is primarily used to convey school-related information and events to learners. It was created by Calvin Foltz and Alexander  Hayden, who hosted it throughout the 2021-2022 schoolyear. Its current hosts are Samuel Yonas and Isaac Lu.

References

External links
 http://www.clcschools.org/page.cfm?p=350

Educational institutions established in 1992
Charter preparatory schools in California
Buildings and structures in Alameda, California
Schools in Alameda County, California
1992 establishments in California